The Boivre is a  long river in western France, a left tributary of the Clain. Its source is near Vasles, in the Deux-Sèvres department.

The Boivre flows through the following departments and towns:

Deux-Sèvres: Vasles
Vienne: Benassay, Lavausseau, La Chapelle-Montreuil, Montreuil-Bonnin, Béruges, Vouneuil-sous-Biard, Biard and Poitiers

It joins the Clain at Poitiers.

References

External links
 100km of hiking trails in the valley of the Boivre - Association ValBoivre

Rivers of France
Rivers of Nouvelle-Aquitaine
Rivers of Deux-Sèvres
Rivers of Vienne